Rantoul is a city in Franklin County, Kansas, United States.  As of the 2020 census, the population of the city was 165.

History
The first post office in Rantoul was established in 1862. It was named for Senator Robert Rantoul Jr., of Massachusetts.

Geography
Rantoul is located at  (38.548508, -95.101778).

Demographics

2010 census
At the 2010 census there were 184 people in 74 households, including 50 families, in the city. The racial makeup of the city was 96.7% White, 0.5% African American, and 2.7% from other races. Hispanic or Latino of any race were 2.7%.

Of the 74 households 32.4% had children under the age of 18 living with them, 48.6% were married couples living together, 13.5% had a female householder with no husband present, 5.4% had a male householder with no wife present, and 32.4% were non-families. 27.0% of households were one person and 10.9% were one person aged 65 or older. The average household size was 2.49 and the average family size was 3.02.

The median age was 40.9 years. 24.5% of residents were under the age of 18; 7.6% were between the ages of 18 and 24; 22.8% were from 25 to 44; 30.5% were from 45 to 64; and 14.7% were 65 or older. The gender makeup of the city was 46.7% male and 53.3% female.

2000 census
At the 2000 census there were 241 people in 84 households, including 66 families, in the city. The racial makeup of the city was 98.76% White, 0.41% from other races, and 0.83% from two or more races. Hispanic or Latino of any race were 2.07%.

Of the 84 households 41.7% had children under the age of 18 living with them, 56.0% were married couples living together, 16.7% had a female householder with no husband present, and 21.4% were non-families. 15.5% of households were one person and 7.1% were one person aged 65 or older. The average household size was 2.87 and the average family size was 3.11.

The age distribution was 35.3% under the age of 18, 6.2% from 18 to 24, 31.5% from 25 to 44, 19.1% from 45 to 64, and 7.9% 65 or older. The median age was 32 years. For every 100 females, there were 95.9 males. For every 100 females age 18 and over, there were 81.4 males.

The median household income was $41,667 and the median family income  was $46,250. Males had a median income of $32,321 versus $20,000 for females. The per capita income for the city was $17,594. None of the families and 1.2% of the population were living below the poverty line.

Education
Rantoulis a part of Central Heights USD 288 school district, headquarters located in Richmond. School mascot is Central Heights Vikings.

Rantoul schools were closed through school unification in 1965. The Rantoul High School mascot was Rantoul Bulldogs.

References

Further reading

External links
 Rantoul - Directory of Public Officials
 USD 288, local school district
 Rantoul city map, KDOT

Cities in Kansas
Cities in Franklin County, Kansas